Jay Richardson (born January 27, 1984) is a former American football linebacker. He played college football for the Ohio State Buckeyes, where he majored in African Studies. He was drafted by the Oakland Raiders in the fifth round of the 2007 NFL Draft and played for the team for three seasons. He also played for the Seattle Seahawks, New York Jets, and New Orleans Saints.

Early years
He played high school football for Dublin Scioto High School in Dublin, Ohio.

Professional career

Oakland Raiders
Richardson was drafted by the Oakland Raiders in the fifth round of the 2007 NFL Draft and played for the team for three seasons.

Seattle Seahawks
Richardson was placed on injured reserve before the start of the 2010 NFL season. He became an unrestricted free agent following the season.

New York Jets
Richardson was signed by the New York Jets on April 16, 2012. Richardson was waived on August 31, 2012.

New Orleans Saints
Richardson had a strong performance during the Saints 2013 training camp but he was cut from the roster at the end of the preseason.  After the Saints sustained several defensive injuries in their first regular season game, Richardson was brought back to the team on September 12, 2013.  The Saints released him again on October 8, 2013, to make room for defensive end Keyunta Dawson.

References

External links

1984 births
Living people
People from Dublin, Ohio
Players of American football from Ohio
American football defensive ends
American football linebackers
Ohio State Buckeyes football players
Oakland Raiders players
Seattle Seahawks players
New York Jets players
New Orleans Saints players